Stuart Robertson (born 10 November 1969), is a New Zealand entrepreneur, designer, and photographer. He is known for taking portraits of the Dalai Lama and Archbishop Desmond Tutu. He has also founded creative focused companies in New Zealand and California.

Early years 
Robertson started his career as an entertainer on TVNZ and stage as a pickpocket, magician, comedian, presenter and emcee. Television shows were prank based shows including the Great Kiwi Video Show and Just Kidding, where he performed all of the pranks.

Peace in 10,000 Hands  

Robertson defined the project as:"An evocative and unstoppable global art project creating a visual provocation to challenge and reinvigorate the conversation for peace. Contemporary artworks that speak profoundly to our similarities in the human condition"Peace in 10,000 Hands has received global media attention and coverage.

Artist 
Robertson is a contemporary artist, adventurer and humanitarian who often works with photography, sculpture, film, symbolism, and social media with cast glass, gold leafs, neon, and lightboxes. His goal is to capture profound images of an ancient and timeless symbol for "Peace", a single white rose.

Films 
Robertson was commissioned by the Auckland War Memorial Museum to create a film for International Day of Peace. The film was projected onto the front of the Museum.

Robertson produced "The Exquisite Clarity of Standing Together", a collaboration with Tiki Taane for his exhibition at Pataka Art + Museum. The collaboration utilized Robertson's images with a specially written original piece of music.

Antarctic Campaigns 
Invited by Antarctica New Zealand as part of the Community Engagement Programme for the 2014 / 2015 and the 2017 / 18 seasons, Robertson stayed at Scott Base on both trips and visited McMurdo Station as part of his Peace in 10,000 Hands Project to raise the importance of Antarctica in his "global context of Peace". as mentioned in the articles 1, 2 and 3 of the Antarctic Treaty

The Antarctic Treaty was signed in the late 1950's, initially by 12 nations and now includes 50 nations representing about two thirds of the world’s population. The Treaty was signed for "Peace and Scientific Endeavor". Most notably Peace being first and this is what drove Robertson’s invitation as an artist.

Robertson visited and photographed the Hillary's Hut as well as Robert Falcon Scott historic hut at Scott's Hut and Captain Shackleton's hut at Cape Royds, and Discovery Hut on Ross Island.

As part of his trip, Robertson camped in the McMurdo Dry Valleys to document the driest and harshest conditions on Earth considered by many as the quietest place in the world.

It is the first and only time Robertson has photographed the rose not being in the hands of a person. The huts are in pristine condition and maintained by Antarctica Heritage Trust. Antarctica was a significant milestone in the project and Robertson's career, resulting in planned exhibitions, a film, and a book.

Other travels 
As part of "Peace in 10,000 Hands", Robertson has traveled to seven continents and takes the rose on road with him as he travels and photographs it in the hands of people in many countries around the world.

Authorship 
In 2015, Robertson published a coffee table book featuring collection of images and stories from the first five years of the project.

Galleries 
Robertson has two permanent galleries in Queenstown, New Zealand for Peace in 10,000 Hands. and Auckland – Gallery 33

References

External Links 
Peace In 10,000 Hands website
Personal website

Living people
1969 births